Mike Foppen (born 29 November 1996) is a Dutch middle- and long-distance runner. He represented Netherlands in the 5000 metres at the 2020 Tokyo Olympics.

Foppen is the Dutch record holder for the 5000 m (outdoors jointly with Kamiel Maase and indoors) and indoor 3000 m.

Personal bests
 1500 m – 3:35.67 (Pfungstadt 2022)
 1500 m – 3:44.93 (Dortmund 2019)
 3000 m – 7:39.75 (Rome 2020)
 3000 m – 7:42.55 (Liévin 2021) 
 5000 m – 13:13.06 (Monaco 2020) =
 5000 m – 13:11.60 (Boston 2023) 
 10,000 m – 27:59.10 (Leiden 2020)

References

1996 births
Living people
Dutch male long-distance runners
Athletes (track and field) at the 2020 Summer Olympics
Olympic athletes of the Netherlands
Sportspeople from Nijmegen
20th-century Dutch people
21st-century Dutch people